The 2nd Filmfare Awards were held in 1955.

Boot Polish and Parineeta won 2 awards each, thus becoming the most-awarded films at the ceremony, with the former winning Best Film and Best Supporting Actor (for David Abraham), and the latter winning Best Director (for Bimal Roy) and Best Actress (for Meena Kumari).

Main Awards

Best Film
Boot Polish

Best Director
Bimal Roy – Parineeta

Best Actor
Bharat Bhushan – Shri Chaitanya Mahaprabhu

Best Actress
Meena Kumari – Parineeta

Best Supporting Actor
David Abraham – Boot Polish

Best Supporting Actress
Usha Kiran – Baadbaan

Best Music Director
S.D. Burman – Taxi Driver for Jaaye To Jaaye Kahaan

Technical Awards

Best Sound
Ishaan Ghosh – Jeewan Jyoti

References

External links
 Winner and nomination of 1st Filmfare Awards at Internet Movie Database

Filmfare Awards
1955 in Indian cinema
1954 film awards